Él (Spanish: Him; re-issued in the US as This Strange Passion) (1953), by  Luis Buñuel, is a Mexican film based upon the novel by Mercedes Pinto. It deals with many themes common to Buñuel’s cinema, including a May–December romance between a woman and her obsessively overprotective bourgeois husband, and touches of surrealism. The film was entered into the 1953 Cannes Film Festival.

Plot
The film opens during a foot washing ceremony in a Christian church where a man named Francisco sees an attractive young woman from across the room. They have seen each other many times before, and she seems reluctant to engage him. She leaves the church and escapes Francisco, despite his attempt to chase after her. Another day, Francisco finds her again in the church. He works up the courage to speak with her, but she seems uninterested, and insists that they can never speak to each other again. Francisco follows her to a restaurant and sees her meeting with Raul, a close friend of his.

Francisco later meets with  Raul, who divulges that he and the young lady, Gloria, are engaged to be married. Francisco conspires to woo Gloria away from Raul by throwing a party and arranging for the couple to attend. When Gloria finds out that Francisco is the host, she seems wary of this ruse, but ultimately falls for his charm and social standing.

The film jumps to the future, where Gloria and Francisco are married, and have been for quite some time. One day, Raul is driving through the city and finds Gloria. As she tells the story to Raul, the film enters a flashback where the first weeks of Gloria and Francisco's marriage are reconstructed. In the flashback, Gloria tells Raul of how horrible her marriage is, because Francisco has turned out to be a jealous, paranoid husband whose socially upright, just appearance falls apart behind closed doors.

Throughout the film, Francisco is in the midst of a lawsuit regarding his property holdings, which causes him considerable duress. For her part, Gloria is frustrated, saddened and ultimately frightened by her husband's treatment. She believes she has always acted innocently and is genuinely surprised by Francisco's accusations, but no one will take her side. Gloria's mother believes Francisco to be a decent man (he is portrayed as an upstanding member of the community), and even their Pastor (Father Velasco) admonishes Gloria for her untoward behavior with other men, and vouches for her husband (while revealing, to Gloria's astonishment, that Francisco had maintained his virginity up until their marriage). After Francisco finds out that she confessed everything to Father Velasco, he shoots her with a revolver loaded with blanks in order to "teach her a lesson." But Gloria tells Raul that Francisco became more caring and forgiving after this episode.

Relations between husband and wife become better for a time, but Francisco's suave veneer continues to fray when he asks Gloria to spend the day with him and takes her to the bellower at the top of a church spire. In a moment of honesty, Francisco finds himself in a misanthropic tirade about the "worms" down below. His rant escalates until he spontaneously begins to strangle Gloria, threatening to throw her over the rail to the sidewalk below to punish her in jealous rage. Gloria pulls herself from danger and runs away. It is only at this point that the flashback comes full circle, and Gloria encounters Raul. After hearing the story, Raul suggests that she leave her husband.

Gloria returns home willingly, but Francisco sees that someone brought her to the house, and demands to know who it was. He is devastated to learn that Gloria had been with Raul. The pattern of Francisco's jealously is unbroken and he contemplates divorce. But he seeks reconciliation after apparently realizing that Gloria has never in fact had an affair. Gloria confesses that "she was confused," but that she had to confide in somebody, and that somebody was Raul. When Francisco realizes that she had told Raul about their marital problems, he regards it as an utter betrayal, and says angrily that he can't forgive her for it.

That night, Francisco attempts to infibulate Gloria in her sleep. As he is trying to tie her up with a rope, she awakes and screams. This scares him off, and he cowers back into his room for the night in dismay and breaks down, as though his actions are spiraling out of his control. The next morning he finds that she has run away. Francisco gets his revolver, and runs off to search for her. He first goes to Raul's office, but he is not there. Outside he sees Raul and Gloria riding in a car together. In an increasingly unhinged fashion, he chases after them all the way to their destination: the church from the beginning of the film. Inside, he discovers that it is not Raul and Gloria after all, but another couple. Francisco descends into madness, and hallucinates that the entire congregation is laughing at him. He looks deliriously around the church until he finally sees the priest, a good friend of his, joining in the laughter. He charges the altar and attacks the priest, and the congregation rushes to the stage. As they pull Francisco off the priest, the priest continues to stick up for Francisco, saying, "don't hurt him, he's my friend; he's gone mad!"

Much later, Gloria, Raul, and a small child pay a visit to a monastery. It is revealed that Francisco has been taken in by the monks and has been taught in their ways. They meet with the head monk, but do not talk with Francisco, not wishing to reopen old wounds. Gloria and Raul have named their child "Francisco",and is implied that the child may not be Raul's. The head monk later tells Francisco of their visit, which he had already observed from afar. He confirms Francisco's suspicion that the child is the son of Gloria and Raul. Francisco affirms that, ultimately, "time has proven my point."  However, he says this not in resentment but in resignation, as he follows with, "but to what avail?" The final shot of the film shows him slowly wandering through the monastery gardens into a dark doorway.

Cast
 Arturo de Córdova - Francisco Galván de Montemayor
 Delia Garcés - Gloria Vilalta
 Aurora Walker - Doña Esperanza Vilalta
 Carlos Martínez Baena - Padre Velasco
 Manuel Dondé - Pablo
 Rafael Banquells - Ricardo Luján
 Fernando Casanova - Lic. Beltrán
 Luis Beristáin - Raul Conde

Production
After completing the initial filming of Adventures of Robinson Crusoe and its release being indefinitely delayed, Buñuel decided to adapt Mercedes Pinto's novel Pensamientos about a paranoid husband. Buñuel also added personal memories of his sister Conchita's paranoid husband, who once mistakenly thought he saw Buñuel making vulgar faces at him on the street and went home to get his gun until his family finally convinced him that Buñuel was living in Zaragoza at the time. Buñuel acknowledged autobiographical elements in the film and stated that "it may be the film I put the most of myself into. There is something of me in the protagonist."

Buñuel later complained about how fast he was forced to shoot the film and that he wanted to remake it. He stated that "I did what I did in most of my Mexican films. They proposed a subject to me and instead of it, I made a counter-offer which, though still commercial, seemed more propitious for examining the things that interested me." Buñuel's producer hired Yucatán-born Mexican actor Arturo de Córdova for the lead role of Francisco Galvan de Montemayor. De Córdova had previously been a Hollywood star in swashbuckling roles, but his heavy Bronx accent often hindered his performances. Buñuel playfully has a cameo in the film's last scene as a priest.

Reception
Él was a critical and financial disappointment, and many audience members in Mexico laughed during the film. Buñuel later stated that he was disappointed by the film overall, but proud that French psychoanalyst Jacques Lacan was known to screen the film for his students as an example of paranoia.

In recent years, the reputation of Él has considerably increased; the film holds a 100% approval rating on Rotten Tomatoes, and the French magazine Cahiers du Cinéma named it one of the 100 essential films of all time.

References

External links

1953 films
1953 drama films
Mexican black-and-white films
Mexican drama films
1950s Spanish-language films
Films about psychiatry
Films based on Spanish novels
Films directed by Luis Buñuel
Films shot in Mexico
1950s Mexican films